Amos Beji Anthony (born 4 January 1999) is a Nigerian footballer who currently plays as a midfielder for Bylis Ballsh in the Albanian Superliga.

Career statistics

Club

Notes

References

1999 births
Living people
Sportspeople from Plateau State
Association football midfielders
Nigerian footballers
KS Egnatia Rrogozhinë players
KF Bylis Ballsh players
Kategoria e Parë players
Kategoria Superiore players
Nigerian expatriate footballers
Nigerian expatriate sportspeople in Albania
Expatriate footballers in Albania